The 1956 Major League Baseball All-Star Game was the 23rd playing of the midsummer classic between the all-stars of the American League (AL) and National League (NL), the two leagues comprising Major League Baseball. The game was held on July 10, 1956, at Griffith Stadium in Washington, D.C. the home of the Washington Senators of the American League.

Opening Lineups

Rosters
Players in italics have since been inducted into the National Baseball Hall of Fame.

Umpires

Line Score

Play-by-play at Baseball-Reference.com

References

Major League Baseball All-Star Game
Major League Baseball All-Star Game
Major League Baseball All Star Game
July 1956 sports events in the United States
Baseball competitions in Washington, D.C.